Henry Dethick (1546–1613) was an English priest.

The son of Gilbert Dethick, Garter Principal King of Arms from 1550 until 1584, he was educated at the University of Oxford.
He was Master of Greetham Hospital; a Master in chancery; Rector of Salkeld; and Archdeacon of Carlisle from 1588 to 1597..

References

1546 births
1613 deaths
Alumni of the University of Oxford
Archdeacons of Carlisle
16th-century English people
17th-century English people